Osprey Publishing is a British, Oxford-based, publishing company specializing in military history. Predominantly an illustrated publisher, many of their books contain full-colour artwork plates, maps and photographs, and the company produces over a dozen ongoing series, each focusing on a specific aspect of the history of warfare. Osprey has published over 2,300 books. They are best known for their Men-at-Arms series, running to over 500 titles, with each book dedicated to a specific historical army or military unit. Osprey is an imprint of Bloomsbury Publishing.

History
In the 1960s, the Brooke Bond Tea Company began including a series of military aircraft cards with packages of their tea. The cards proved popular, and the artist Dick Ward proposed the idea of publishing illustrated books about military aircraft. The idea was approved and a small subsidiary company called Osprey was formed in 1968. The company’s first book, North American P-51D Mustang in USAAF-USAF Service, was published in 1969. Soon after, Ward proposed trying the same idea with famous military units, and in 1971 the first Men-at-Arms title appeared. In the late 70s, the firm was acquired by George Philip Ltd. In 1988, Philip was acquired by Reed International; it was sold to the private equity firm Botts & Company.

During these years, the firm grew steadily, adding new titles and new series to their catalogue. Although they have produced books of all types, the main focus remains on military history, particularly the military history of Britain. Osprey Publishing now publishes an average of 10-12 books a month.

Shire Books was acquired in 2007, and the science fiction, fantasy and horror imprint Angry Robot was purchased from HarperCollins in 2010. The reprint house Old House was acquired in 2011. To continue expansion, a majority stake in Osprey was sold by Botts to Alcuin Capital Partners in 2011. In 2012, Osprey acquired Duncan Baird (later renamed Nourish) and its Watkins imprint. In 2013, Osprey acquired British Wildlife Publishing.

In 2014, Osprey and its imprints were sold by Alcuin. Angry Robot, Nourish, and Watkins went to Etan Ilfeld while Osprey, Shire, Old House, and British Wildlife went to Bloomsbury Publishing.

Series

Air Vanguard – Launched in Autumn 2012, it is the technical aviation series whose books give a concise history of an aircraft's design and operational history.
Aircraft of the Aces – A series that focuses on fighter pilots who became aces with first-hand accounts, aircraft profiles, unit listings, and scale plans.
Aviation Elite Units–- Provides a full combat history of a fighter or bomber unit that earned particular distinction in action with first hand accounts, stories of the members of each unit, and specially commissioned aircraft profile drawings and illustrations.
Battle Orders – details the organization of famous military units.
Campaign – individual battles or campaigns in military history.
Combat – Launched in September 2013, this series details the differences between soldiers of opposing armies in the field.
Combat Aircraft – Concentrates on aircraft in aviation history, the technology behind it, and the men who flew it.
Command – details the lives of important generals and admirals.
Dark Osprey – a comedic series detailing paranormal topics such as Nazi zombies and alien invasions.
Duel – comparing contemporary opponents, such as French and British frigates in the age of sail or German and Soviet tanks on the Eastern Front.
Elite – details individual units or tactics.
Essential Histories – Each book studies the origins, politics, fighting, and repercussions of one major war or theatre of war, from both military and civilian perspectives.
Fortress – details important fortifications from Roman forts to Hitler's bunkers to the Berlin Wall.
Men-at-Arms – An illustrated reference on the history, organisation, uniforms, and equipment of the world's military forces, past and present.
Myths and Legends – Examines the great stories that have echoed down through time to help shape our cultures. Each title focuses on a specific legendary figure retelling the related myth and also provides information about the history behind the story and its evolution over time. Includes Victor Stapleton's 2014 book on Jack the Ripper.
New Vanguard – approx 200 books on military equipment such as vehicles, artillery, and ships
Osprey Wargames – a series of wargaming rules.
Osprey Modelling – how-to guide to military model making.
Raid – details about famous military raiding actions or daring plans.
Warrior – focuses on a specific type of warrior of a certain period or culture, examining their experiences on the battlefield as well as training, fighting methods and day to day living.
Weapon – discusses individual weapons from sidearms to artillery.

Publications 
 Classic Volkswagens (1998)
 Field of Glory (2008)

Reception 
Martijn Lak noted that "Osprey Publishing are to be applauded for paying attention" and publishing works about events that are "largely unknown to the Anglo-American audience". Lak also noted that many Osprey books, for example from its Raid series, are "superbly illustrated with pictures, maps, and photos."

References

External links
 of Osprey Publishing

Book publishing companies of the United Kingdom
Companies based in Oxford
Mass media in Oxford
Publishing companies established in 1969
Books about military history